The 1999 Melbourne Cup was the 139th running of the Melbourne Cup, a prestigious Australian Thoroughbred horse race.

The race won by Rogan Josh, trained by Bart Cummings and ridden by John Marshall.

Field 

This is a list of horses which ran in the 1999 Melbourne Cup.

References

1999
Melbourne Cup
Melbourne Cup
1990s in Melbourne
November 1999 sports events in Australia